Metalopha gloriosa is a moth of the family Noctuidae first described by Otto Staudinger in 1887. It is found from western Turkey to eastern Taurus Mountains, Iraq, Anatolia, Israel, Jordan, Lebanon and Syria.

Adults are on wing from February to March. There is one generation per year.

The larvae probably feed on Launaea species.

Subspecies
Metalopha gloriosa gloriosa
Metalopha gloriosa ingloria (Israel)

External links

Cuculliinae
Insects of Turkey
Moths of the Middle East
Moths described in 1892